Galwegian or Galwegians may refer to:
 Of Galway (disambiguation)
 Of or pertaining to Galway, Ireland, or to its residents.
 Galwegians RFC, rugby club in Galway, Ireland
 Of Galloway (disambiguation)
 Of, or pertaining to, Galloway, Scotland, or to its historic people, language and culture.
 Galwegian Gaelic, extinct dialect of Galloway, Scotland

See also
 Glaswegian (of Glasgow)